Downright Dencey is a 1927 children's historical novel by Caroline Dale Snedeker. The novel, illustrated by Maginel Wright Barney, was first published in 1927 and was a Newbery Honor recipient in 1928.

Plot
The story is set in Nantucket, Massachusetts shortly after the War of 1812, and deals with the unlikely friendship between a Quaker girl, Dencey Coffyn, and Jetsam, the adopted son of the town drunk. Their friendship was formed when Dencey sought his forgiveness for hurting him with a stone. In exchange for his forgiveness, she taught him to read and they became even closer which was met with disapproval by her mother. The reason for this  was because Jetsam was a socially outcast boy who displayed characteristics not in keeping with Quakerism. However, Dencey refused to part ways with Jetsam leading her mother to banish her to her room with only bread and water as punishment. Nevertheless, the friendship grew even stronger to the point where Jetsam saved Dencey's life from a deadly storm. She was trapped in it while attempting to save him from accepting a job with the horrible Professor Snubshoe. Afterwards, he gained favor with Dencey's family who adopted him and helped him to transform into an admirable young man. As Dencey and Jetsam grew closer and older, they developed romantic feelings for each other. Finally, Jetsam asked Dencey to marry him.

Characters 
 Dionis "Dencey" Cofyn - The heroine of story. A girl who is viewed as a rebel but in her rebellion helps to change the life of a boy who was in need.
 Jetsam - The young man who was rejected and mistreated by society but accepted by Dencey.
 Lydia - Dencey's mother, a strong and devout woman who was worried about her daughter's morality.
 Captain Tom Cofyn - Dencey's father who spent a lot of time away from his family while working at sea but when he returned he made his household happy.
 Hopestill - Dencey's cousin who was pious and obedient.
 Peggy - The maid who helped to take care of the Cofyn's household.
 Injun Jill - Jetsam's adopted mother who was an alcoholic and beggar.
 Professor Snubshoe - The evil magician

Sequel
A sequel, The Beckoning Road, was published in 1929. It follows the fortunes of Dencey's family as they move to Indiana and join the utopian community of New Harmony.

References

External links
 Full text of Downright Dencey at HathiTrust Digital Library

1927 American novels
Children's historical novels
American children's novels
Newbery Honor-winning works
Novels set on Cape Cod and the Islands
War of 1812 fiction
Nantucket in fiction
Novels set on islands
1927 children's books
Novels by Caroline Snedeker